Odostomia trifida, common name the three-toothed odostome,  is a species of sea snail, a marine gastropod mollusk in the family Pyramidellidae, the pyrams and their allies.

Description
The ivory or off-white shell is smooth and glossy. Its length measures 6 mm. The teleoconch contains eight whorls, with about six impressed revolving lines, the one above and two next below the suture wider and more distinct, and ten or twelve very minute lines at the base of the body whorl. The fold is sharp and oblique.

Distribution
This species occurs in the Atlantic Ocean from New England, USA to New Jersey.

References

 Gastropods.com: Odostomia (Boonea) trifida; retrieved: 21 January 2012

External links
 To ITIS

trifida
Gastropods described in 1834